Piece of My Soul is the second studio album by Japanese rock band Wands. The album includes 3 previously released singles, "Sekai ga Owaru Made wa", "Jumpin' Jack Boy" and "Secret Night ~It's My Treat~". The album  was released on October 6, 1995 under B-Gram Records label. It reached #1 on the Oricon charts for its first week with 542,370 sold copies. It charted for 12 weeks and sold 963,560 copies. It is the last studio album where the vocalist is Show Uesugi and other original former members left after release of compilation album, SINGLES COLLECTION+6.

Track listing

References 

1995 albums
Wands (band) albums
Being Inc. albums
Japanese-language albums